"Better Half of Me" is a song by Scottish singer-songwriter Tom Walker. The song was released as a digital download on 4 October 2019 as the fourth single from the deluxe edition of his debut studio album, What a Time to Be Alive. The song was written by Tom Walker, Joel Laslett Pott and Cam Blackwood.

Music video
A music video to accompany the release of "Better Half of Me" was first released onto YouTube on 11 October 2019.

Track listing

Charts

Certifications

References

2019 singles
2019 songs
Tom Walker (singer) songs
Songs written by Joel Pott
Song recordings produced by Mark Ralph (record producer)
Songs written by Cam Blackwood
Song recordings produced by Cam Blackwood
Songs written by Tom Walker (singer)